Doksany is a municipality and village in Litoměřice District in the Ústí nad Labem Region of the Czech Republic. It has about 400 inhabitants.

History

The oldest settlement dates back between 4500 and 2500 BC. In 1993, archaeologists discovered more ancient buildings and settlements that dated back to the same period of time. The first written mention of Doksany is from 1151 by chronicler Vincencius, who wrote about the Doksany convent. It was probably founded in 1144 by Gertrude of Babenberg and Vladislaus II as the second convent in the kingdom.

Geography
It lies in a flat agricultural landscape of the Lower Eger Table. It lies on the right bank of the Ohře river, which forms the western municipal border.

Climate
During the June 2019 European heat wave, Doksany broke the record for the hottest temperature in June in the Czech Republic. The Czech Hydrometeorological Institute claimed that the temperature reached  and warned that it could change to 40 degrees Celsius.

Demographics

Economy
There is a small hydropower plant on the Ohře river. It is part of a historic weir from 1937.

Sights
Doksany is known for the Premonstratensian Convent with the Church of the Nativity of Mary. The religious community still lives in it, but under certain conditions it is open to the public.

References

External links

Villages in Litoměřice District